Toz (means "dust" in Turkish) is a Turkish short film. It gained a number of awards at various film festivals in the category of short films.

The film is a series of microepisodes that portray elements of an imperfect relationship of a couple: abuse, control, incomprehension, acceptance.

Awards
Corta! Porto International Short Film Festival, Portugal, International Competition: Best Film, 2005
Istanbul Commerce University, National Competition: Best Film, 2005
International Istanbul Short Film Days, National Competition: Special Jury Award, 2005
Ankara International Film Festival, Turkey, National Competition: Second Place Award in Fiction, 2005
!f Istanbul AFM Independent Film Festival, National Competition: Special Jury Award, 2005
Akbank National Short Film Festival, National Competition: Jury Mention Award, 2004 (offline version)
Columbia Tristar National Short Film Competition, Turkey: Best Film Award, 2004(offline version)
European Film Academy Awards 2005 "Short Film Nominee”
Fipresci Award 
Short Film - Prix UIP

References

External links
 

2005 films
Turkish short films
Films set in Turkey
2005 short films